Lloyd deMause (pronounced de-Moss; September 19, 1931 – April 23, 2020) was an American lay psychoanalyst and social historian, best known for his pioneering work in the field of psychohistory. He did graduate work in political science at Columbia University and later trained as a psychoanalyst. He is the founder of the Journal of Psychohistory.

Psychohistory

Beginning in the 1970s, DeMause began conceiving of psychohistory, a field of study of the psychological motivations of historical events, and their associated patterns of behavior. It seeks to understand the emotional origin of the social and political behavior of groups and nations—past and present—by analyzing events in childhood and the family, especially child abuse.

Psychohistorians endorse trauma models of schizoid, narcissistic, masochistic, borderline, depressive and neurotic personalities. The chart below shows the dates at which gradual forms of child abuse are believed by psychohistorians to have evolved in the most advanced nations, based on accounts from historical records; for reasons of limits of research and of societal morale, the timeline does not apply to hunter-gatherer societies, nor to the ancient Greek, Roman and Chinese societies where there were a wide variety of childrearing practices. The major childrearing types described by Lloyd deMause are:

With the exception of the "helping mode of childrearing" (marked in yellow above), for psychohistorians the major childrearing types are related to main psychiatric disorders, as can be seen in the following Table of Historical Personalities:

According to deMause's research, each of the above psychoclasses coexist in the modern world today, and are underlying factors of society that allow patterns of abuse to continue.

Legacy
In a 1994 interview with deMause in The New Yorker, interviewer Stephen Schiff wrote that "to buy into psychohistory, you have to subscribe to some fairly woolly assumptions [...], for instance, that a nation's child-rearing techniques affect its foreign policy", but confessed that "deMause's analyses have often been weirdly prescient."

Controversy
Contributing to his ostracization from psychoanalytic circles, deMause was a contributor to the Satanic ritual abuse hysteria of the early 1990s, in part via the circulation of his article "Why Cults Terrorize and Kill Children", where he labelled skeptics of reports of the abuse "molesters" and "pedophile advocates". The article was used as a reliable source by ritual abuse proponents.

Publications
DeMause published over 90 scholarly articles and several books.

Books

Articles (selection)
 DeMause, Lloyd  (1974): The Evolution of Childhood. In: History of Childhood Quarterly: The Journal of Psychohistory, 1 (4), p. 503-575. (Comments and reply: p. 576-606) 
 DeMause, Lloyd (1987): The History of Childhood in Japan. In: The Journal of Psychohistory, 15 (2), p. 147-151.
 DeMause, Lloyd (1988): On Writing Childhood History. In: The Journal of Psychohistory, 16 (2), p. 35-71.
 DeMause, Lloyd (1989): The Role of Adaptation and Selection in Psychohistorical Evolution. In: The Journal of Psychohistory, 16 (4), p. 355-372 (Comments and reply: p. S. 372–404).
 DeMause, Lloyd (1990): The History of Child Assault. In: The Journal of Psychohistory, 18 (1), p. 1-29.
 DeMause, Lloyd (1991): The Universality of Incest. In: The Journal of Psychohistory, 19 (1), p. 123-164.
 DeMause, Lloyd (1997): The Psychogenic Theory of History. In: The Journal of Psychohistory, 25 (1), p. 112-183.

See also

 Early infanticidal childrearing

Notes

External links

  DeMause's bio
 
 
On-line repository of deMause' books

1931 births
2020 deaths
Writers from Detroit
Columbia University alumni
21st-century American historians
American male non-fiction writers
21st-century American psychologists
Child abuse
Historians from Michigan
21st-century American male writers